Statistics of Swedish football Division 3 for the 2002 season.

League standings

Norra Norrland 2002

Mellersta Norrland 2002

Södra Norrland 2002

Norra Svealand 2002

Östra Svealand 2002

Västra Svealand 2002

Nordöstra Götaland 2002

Nordvästra Götaland 2002

Mellersta Götaland 2002

Sydöstra Götaland 2002

Sydvästra Götaland 2002

Södra Götaland 2002

Footnotes

References 

Swedish Football Division 3 seasons
4
Sweden
Sweden